The Transport Act 1981 was an Act of Parliament in the United Kingdom. Amongst other items it introduced the compulsory wearing of seat belts for front seat passengers for a trial period of three year.

The major part of the act was for re-organising the British Transport Docks Board which led to its eventual privatisation.

The Act received Royal Assent 31 July 1981.

Clauses of the Act

Reorganisation of British Transport Docks Board
Part II of the act renamed the British Transport Docks Board as Associated British Ports and made it a subsidiary a holding company limited by shares to be issued by the Secretary of State or their agents, thus making its privatisation possible.

Seatbelt legislation
It had been compulsory to fit front seat belts to cars built in Europe since 1965 and to all new cars sold in the UK since 1967. The Clunk Click" TV commercials, starring Jimmy Savile showing the dangers of being thrown through the windscreen in a collision was shown during the 1970s. Attempts were made to making the wearing of front seat belts compulsory into a Road Traffic Bill in 1973-4 but was unsuccessful. John Gilbert, the Minister of Transport proposed a 'Road Traffic (Seat Belts) Bill' in 1976 but it was also unsuccessful. Four further attempts at legislation were made by a number of MPs including Bill Rodgers and Neil Carmichael before Lord Nugent (who was also the president of the Royal Society for the Prevention of Accidents) was finally successful, initially by proposing a private member's bill, and then by adding it as an amendment to the Transport Bill in the House of Lords. The House of Commons voted to accept the amendment on 28 July 1981.

Legacy
Following the three-year trial the compulsory wearing of seat belts was made permanent when both Houses of Parliament voted 'overwhelmingly' to retain the requirement. Legislation was subsequently introduced for the compulsory fitting of seat belts to the rear of cars (1987), for children to wear seat belts in the back (1989), and then adults(1991). Seat belts were required for minibuses and coaches carrying school children (1996) and for all coaches (2001).

References

External links
Transport Act 1981 - Hansard

UK Legislation 

United Kingdom Acts of Parliament 1981
1981 in transport
Transport policy in the United Kingdom
History of transport in the United Kingdom
Transport legislation